MSC Magnifica is a Musica-class cruise ship operated by MSC Cruises. Constructed by STX Europe in Saint-Nazaire, the ship was launched in January 2009, completed in January 2010, and  entered service in March 2010.

MSC Cruises announced the suspension of all North American itineraries until June 30, 2020 due to the COVID-19 pandemic.

Design and description

The fourth ship to be built to the Musica-class design, MSC Magnifica was constructed by STX Europe in their shipyard at Saint-Nazaire, France. She was built at a cost of $547 million.

MSC Magnifica has 1,259 cabins – 2,550 passengers can be carried at double occupancy, while 3,605 can be carried at full capacity. The ship has 1,027 crew.

Facilities
The ship has 13 passenger accessible decks, three swimming pools, a gymnasium, spa, and wellness center, a 1,250-seat Art Deco-style theatre, casino, cinema, bowling alley and a number of dining areas and bars.

Refit
The 140 million euro renovation will bring two new restaurants, a new shopping area, a new water park, 215 new cabins (92 with balcony), and the most modern ecological systems: a state-of-the-art Selective Catalytic Reduction (SCR) system and next-generation Advanced Wastewater Treatment (AWT) system. The vessel will also get a shore-power system.

Construction and career
MSC Magnifica was identified by the shipyard hull number T32 during construction. MSC Magnificas onboard disco is named after her shipyard hull number.

MSC Magnifica was floated out of her dry dock in a launching ceremony on 16 January 2009. A 72-hour sea trial period was completed on 17 January 2010. A flag-changing ceremony was held on 25 February 2010 in Saint-Nazaire. The ship was christened on 6 March 2010 at a ceremony in Hamburg by the godmother to the MSC Cruises fleet, Italian actress Sophia Loren.

MSC Magnifica received criticism in April 2014 after it was revealed that Brazilian police had to rescue eleven crew members on board that were living in 'slave-like conditions' whilst docked in Salvador, Brazil.

On 5 January 2019, MSC Magnifica began her first World Cruise. The ship departed from Genoa and sailed for 119. MSC Magnifica visited 6 continents, 32 countries and 49 destinations. The ship returned to Genoa on 3 May 2019.

MSC Magnifica undertook a second World Cruise leaving in January 2020. The 116-night cruise started at Genoa on 5 January 2020 and intended to call at 43 ports in 23 countries. The vessel was scheduled to end her World Cruise in Genoa on 30 April 2020.

Incidents

Coronavirus pandemic 

On 23 March 2020, the ship was headed for Fremantle, Western Australia, for refueling and resupplying, but was denied permission to dock because authorities wrongly believed there were COVID-19 patients on board; the crew denied having any cases of the virus on board.

The ship was not allowed to dock in Dubai, and instead on 6 April made a "technical stop" in Colombo, Sri Lanka, where a 75-year-old German heart patient and a Sri Lankan chef, who had made a successful plea on social media to be allowed to repatriate himself, were disembarked. The Sri Lanka Navy took charge of them; On 14 April, the German woman who evacuated the ship died.

On 20 April 2020, MSC Magnifica docked in Marseille, France, letting out all its passengers and terminating the cruise.  MSC Cruises stated that no passengers and no crew members had shown any coronavirus symptoms.  Some passengers had previously disembarked in Australia in mid-March and planned to fly to Europe, according to one report. The rest of the ship's guests had continued to France.

References

External links

 MSC Magnifica webpage at MSC Cruises website
 Deck Plans from Seascanner.com

Magnifica
2009 ships
Cruise ships involved in the COVID-19 pandemic